Super Mario Bros. 2 is the North American sequel to Super Mario Bros. for the Nintendo Entertainment System.

Super Mario Bros. 2 may also refer to:

 Super Mario Bros.: The Lost Levels, the original, Japan-exclusive sequel to Super Mario Bros. with the same name as the North American sequel; later re-released outside Japan as The Lost Levels in Super Mario All-Stars for the Super Nintendo Entertainment System
 New Super Mario Bros. 2, the second handheld title in the New Super Mario Bros. series and the third game in the series
 Mario Bros. II, a 1987 Commodore 64 port and sequel of the 1983 LCD Game & Watch game Mario Bros. (which features gameplay unrelated to the platforming Mario Bros. games)